Sha Tin Hoi / Sha Tin Sea or Tide Cove is a cove at the mouth of the Shing Mun River. It is between Ma Liu Shui and Ma On Shan. The cove is open to Tolo Harbour (Tai Po Hoi). It was largely reclaimed for the development of Sha Tin New Town.

Tide Cove may shrink further in the future, as the government is exploring further land reclamation at Ma Liu Shui.

See also

 Sha Tin Sewage Treatment Works
 Mountain Shore

References

Bays of Hong Kong
Sha Tin District
Coves